The Middleton Railway is the world's oldest continuously working railway, situated in the English city of Leeds. It was founded in 1758 and is now a heritage railway, run by volunteers from The Middleton Railway Trust Ltd. since 1960.

Origins: Middleton colliery 

Coal has been worked in Middleton since the 13th century, from bell pits, gin pits and later "day level" or adits. Anne Leigh, heiress to the Middleton Estates, married Ralph Brandling from Felling near Gateshead on the River Tyne. They lived in Gosforth and left running of the Middleton pits to agents. Charles Brandling was their successor. In 1754, Richard Humble, from Tyneside, was his agent. Brandling was in competition with the Fentons in Rothwell who were able to transport coal into Leeds by river, putting the Middleton pits at considerable disadvantage. Humble's solution was to build waggonways which were common in his native north east. The first waggonway in 1755 crossed Brandling land and that of friendly neighbours to riverside staithes at Thwaite Gate.

In 1757 he proposed to build a waggonway towards Leeds, and to ensure its permanence Brandling sought ratification in an Act of Parliament, (31 Geo.2, c.xxii, 9 June 1758) the first authorising the building of a railway.

The Middleton Railway, the first railway to be granted powers by Act of Parliament, carried coal cheaply from the Middleton pits to the Staith at Casson Close, Leeds (near Meadow Lane, close to the River Aire). Not all the land belonged to Brandling, and the Act gave him power to obtain wayleave. Otherwise the line was privately financed and operated, initially as a waggonway using horse-drawn waggons.

Cheap Middleton coal gradually enabled Leeds to become a centre of the many developing industries which used coal as a source of heat, e.g. for pottery, brick and glass making, metal working, and brewing, or as a source of power for mill and factory engines.

Introduction of steam 

In 1812 the Middleton Railway became the first commercial railway to use steam locomotives successfully. John Blenkinsop, the colliery's viewer, or manager, had decided that an engine light enough not to break the cast iron track would not have sufficient adhesion, bearing in mind the heavy load of coal wagons and the steep track gradient. Accordingly, he relaid the track on one side with a toothed rail, which he patented in 1811 (the first rack railway), and approached Matthew Murray of Fenton, Murray and Wood, in Holbeck, to design a locomotive with a pinion which would mesh with it. Murray's design was based on Richard Trevithick's Catch me who can, adapted to use Blenkinsop's rack and pinion system, and probably was called Salamanca. This 1812 locomotive was the first to use two cylinders. These drove the pinions through cranks which were at right angles, so that the engine would start wherever it came to rest.

In 1812, Salamanca was the first commercial steam locomotive to operate successfully. Three other locomotives were built for the Middleton colliery, and the railway was locomotive-operated for more than twenty years. 
A number of other firsts can be claimed by the railway. Being the first line to use steam locomotives regularly on freight trains it was naturally the first line to employ a train driver. The world's first regular, professional train driver was a former pit surface labourer named James Hewitt who had been trained by Fenton, Murray & Wood's test driver. The first member of the public to be killed by a locomotive was almost certainly a 13-year-old boy named John Bruce killed in February 1813 whilst running alongside the tracks. Leeds Mercury reported that this would "operate as a warning to others".

Though it was considered a marvel at the time, a child who witnessed it was less impressed. The child, David Joy, became a successful engineer.
Living in Hunslet Lane, on the London Road, the old coal railway from the Middleton Pits into Leeds, ran behind our house a few fields off, and we used to see the steam from the engines rise above the trees. Once I remember going with my nurse, who held my hand (I had to stretch it up to hers, I was so little) while we stood to watch the engine with its train of coal-wagons pass. We were told it would come up like a flash of lightning, but it only came lumbering on like a cart.

Boiler explosions and horse haulage 
Salamanca's boiler exploded on 28 February 1818 killing the driver when, as a result of the force of the explosion, he was "carried, with great violence, into an adjoining field the distance of one hundred yards." This was the result of the driver tampering with the safety valves. Another boiler explosion occurred on 12 February 1834, again killing the driver. This time the most likely cause was a badly worn boiler, kept going by in-house repairs which were no longer expertly carried out after Blenkinsop's death. The driver killed on this occasion was James Hewitt, the world's first regular locomotive driver.

The Blenkinsop engines remained at work for thirty years: when John Urpeth Rastrick and James Walker visited the line on the behalf of the Directors of the Liverpool & Manchester Railway in January 1829 noted they were still at work, one of them being recorded as pulling a load of thirty load coal wagons, weighing 140 tons. At least two were working until 1835.

Horse haulage returned and steam was abandoned apart from about a  section near the main pit, which for some time was chain-worked by a stationary steam engine.

Return of steam
Steam was reintroduced in 1866 with tank engines from local firm Manning Wardle. In 1881 the railway was converted to  allowing it to connect with the Midland Railway. Other extra links included one to the Great Northern Railway in 1899 and sidings serving other sources of freight including Robinson & Birdsell's scrapyard and Clayton, Sons & Co's engineering works.
The Middleton Estate & Colliery Co became part of the nationalised National Coal Board in 1947. Some rationalisation took place, the city centre staith at Kidacre street was closed and in the end coal movement was concentrated on the stretch of line from the GNR connection to Broom Pit. Preservationists mainly from Leeds University were allowed to move into an abandoned part of the line, between Moor Road and the GNR connection, by its then owners Messrs. Clayton, Son & Co. When Broom Pit closed in 1968 the preservationists, by then called the Middleton Railway Trust, were able to reinstate the connection and operate to the site of Broom Pit, maintaining the continuous operation of the line.

Preservation 

In June 1960, the Middleton Railway became the first standard-gauge railway to be taken over and operated by unpaid volunteers. Passenger services were initially operated for only one week, using an ex Swansea and Mumbles Railway double deck tram (the largest in Britain seating 106 passengers), hauled by a 1931 diesel locomotive hired from the nearby Hunslet Engine Company. However, the volunteers of the Middleton Railway subsequently operated a freight service from September 1960 until 1983.

Regular operation of passenger services began in 1969.

The Middleton Steam Railway is home to a representative selection of locomotives built in the Jack Lane, Hunslet area by the famous Leeds manufacturers of John Fowler & Co., Hudswell Clarke, Hunslet Engine Company, Kitson & Co. and Manning Wardle.  The locomotives include "Sir Berkeley", which was featured in the 1968 BBC TV version of "The Railway Children". The locomotive is owned by the Vintage Carriages Trust of Ingrow near Keighley.

Route and stations 

Although the operational line starts at Moor Road, the line actually begins with the Balm Road Branch which joins the Middleton Railway with the Leeds - Sheffield route of the Hallam & Pontefract Lines. However, the connection to the main network has not been used since 1990 and has been bolted closed preventing access. This section of track crosses Beza Road, Tulip Street and Moor Road. It is currently only used during special events as the line and crossings would need upgrading for regular use.

Located few yards from Moor Road level crossing is the line's main terminus, Moor Road station. The site includes the Engine House museum and workshops along with a single platform for departing and arriving trains. The site was once a junction between the link to the Midland Railway mainline via the "Balm Road Branch" and the line to Kidacre Street coal staith near the centre of the city.

Departing Moor Road, are a selection of locomotives and rolling stock stored on sidings before the tunnel. The tunnel is the only one located on the route and allows the railway to pass under the M621 motorway. Immediately after, there is the junction with the Dartmouth Branch, a stub of the line that once connected various local metal industries with the main line. This is occasionally used on special events and has in recent years been used for training mainline track workers. This branch is close to the former connection to the Great Northern line.

After the Dartmouth Branch, the line begins to enter Middleton Park. The line passes by the John Charles Centre for Sport on its right and the South Leeds Academy on its left. There are two over bridges on this section: one road bridge, carrying John Charles Approach and a second footbridge connecting the school and the sports centre.

Located close to the site of Broom Pit colliery and on the edge of Middleton Park, Park Halt railway station is the current terminus of services at the far end of the line. Branches once continued to Day Hole End and to West Pit via a rope worked incline. There were also numerous wagonways from early pits in the park, the remains of which can still be seen. The station consists of a platform for Middleton Park and a run round loop for trains allowing return running.

A proposed extension of the railway into Middleton Park has been discussed for many years and it has long been the ambition of the railway to run further in to Middleton Park. Plans have existed for some time to extend the railway to the centre of the park, however this would require significant earthworks and funding.

Route gallery

Motive power

Steam locomotives

Diesel and electric locomotives

Trams
Following the closure of the Mumbles Railway by South Wales Transport attempts were made to preserve some rolling stock at the Middleton Railway. One car (no. 2) was saved for preservation by members of Leeds University in Yorkshire and stored at the Middleton Railway. However, it was heavily vandalised and eventually destroyed by fire leading to the tram being scrapped. An experimental Leeds single deck tram, number 601, was preserved at the Middleton Railway along with tram 202 owned by Leeds Museums. These were, however, also destroyed by vandalism and arson during 1962. Leeds Horsfield Tram No 160 and Feltham Tram No 517 suffered the same fate at Middleton in 1968.

Rolling stock

References
Notes

Bibliography

 
 A History of the Middleton Railway, Eighth Edition, Middleton Railway Trust, 2004
 From Rag to Railway, Middleton Railway Trust, 
 Middleton Railway stocklist, Middleton Railway Trust, available from the railway's shop

External links

 The Middleton Railway — the railway's official website
 Friends of Middleton Park
 "The Collier" (Middleton Railway Scene 1814 or earlier)
 

Heritage railways in Yorkshire
Tourist attractions in Leeds
Early British railway companies
4 ft 1 in gauge railways in England
Transport in Leeds
Rail transport in West Yorkshire
Railway lines opened in 1758
Rack railways in the United Kingdom
Museums in West Yorkshire
Railway museums in England
Standard gauge railways in England
Horse-drawn railways
Leeds Blue Plaques